Bunk'd is an American comedy television series created by Pamela Eells O'Connell that premiered on Disney Channel on July 31, 2015. The series is a spinoff of Jessie and includes returning stars Peyton List, Karan Brar, and Skai Jackson. Starring alongside them is Miranda May.

Series overview

Episodes

Season 1 (2015–16)

Season 2 (2016–17)

Season 3 (2018)

Season 4 (2019–20)

Season 5 (2021)

Season 6: Learning the Ropes (2022–23)

References 

Lists of American children's television series episodes
Lists of American comedy television series episodes
Lists of Disney Channel television series episodes